The New Zealand national speedway team are a national speedway team from New Zealand. They were winners of the World Team Cup in 1979

Honours

World Championships

Famous riders
Ivan Mauger 6 time individual world champion, 1 time intercontinental champion, 4 times team world cup champion(3 won representing Great Britain), 2 times world pairs champion.
Barry Briggs 4 time individual world champion,  2 times team world cup champion(1 won representing Great Britain).
Ronnie Moore 2 time individual world champion, 1 time world pairs champion

References

National speedway teams
National speedway team